Anthony Barr or Tony Barr may refer to:

 Anthony Barr (American football) (born 1992), American linebacker
 Anthony James Barr (born 1940), American programming language designer, software engineer, and inventor
 Anthony Barr (judge) (born 1961), Irish judge
 Tony Barr (Pennsylvania politician)